Selected recordings of compositions by Arthur Honegger

Discographies of classical composers
Discographies of Swiss artists